

Australia
Sergio Redegalli (b. 1962)
Zoja Trofimiuk (b. 1952)

Austria
Ena Rottenberg (1893–19520)

Belgium
Daniël Theys (b. 1953)

Canada
Sarah Hall (b. 1951)
Catherine Labonté

Czech Republic

Jaroslava Brychtová (1924–2020)
Stanislav Libenský (1921–2002)
Ivana Mašitová (b. 1961)
Bořek Šípek (1949–2016)

Estonia
Meeli Kõiva (b. 1960)
Ivo Lill (1953–2019)

Finland
Timo Sarpaneva (1926–2006)

France

Claire Deleurme
Émile Gallé (1846–1904)
René Lalique (1860–1945)
Louis Majorelle (1859–1926)
Maurice Marinot (1882–1960)

Germany
Leopold Blaschka (1822–1895)
Rudolf Blaschka (1857–1939)
Erwin Eisch (1927–2022)
Hans Godo Frabel (b. 1941)
Nabo Gass (b. 1954)
Thomas Schütte (b. 1954)

Hong Kong
Carol Lee Mei Kuen (b. 1963)

Israel

Italy
Alfredo Barbini (1912-2007)
Marietta Barovier (15th-century Venice)
Silvia Levenson (b. 1957 in Buenos Aires, Argentina)
Lino Tagliapietra (b. 1934)
Paolo Venini (1895–1959)
Silvio Vigliaturo (b. 1949)
Hermonia Vivarini (16th-century Venice)

Japan
Keiko Mukaide (b. 1954)

The Netherlands
 Antoon Derkinderen (20 December 1859 – Amsterdam, 2 November 1925)

New Zealand
Te Rongo Kirkwood (b. 1973)
Tony Kuepfer (b. 1947)
Elizabeth McClure (b. 1957)
Ann Robinson (b. 1944)

Philippines
Marge Organo, contemporary glass artist

Poland
Zbigniew Horbowy (1935–2019)
Józef Mehoffer (1869–1946)
Tomasz Urbanowicz (b. 1959)

Sweden
Vicke Lindstrand (1904–1983)

United Kingdom
Charles Bray (1922–2012)
Freda Coleborn (1911–1965)
Sam Herman (b. 1936, Mexico City)
Jeremy Langford (b. 1956)
Danny Lane (b. 1955)
Peter Newsome (b. 1943)
David Reekie (b. 1947)
Salvador Ysart (1878–1955)

United States

Irving Amen (1918–2011), stained glass
Gary Beecham (b. 1955)
Howard Ben Tré (1949–2020)
Martin Blank (b. 1962)
Jean-Pierre Canlis (b. 1973)
Frederick Carder (1863–1963, born in Staffordshire, England)
Ed Carpenter (b. 1946)
Dale Chihuly (b. 1941)
Deborah Czeresko (b. 1961)
Dan Dailey (b. 1947)
Fritz Dreisbach (b. 1941)
Robert C. Fritz (1920–1986)
Michael Glancy (1950–2020)
Katherine Gray (b. 1965)
Skowmon Hastanan (b. 1961)
Paul Housberg (b. 1953)
Michael Janis (b. 1959)
Andi Kovel (b. 1969)
Dominick Labino (1910–1987)
Karen LaMonte (b. 1967)
Helen Lee (artist) (b. 1978)
Marvin Lipofsky (1938–2016)
Harvey Littleton (1922–2013)
John Littleton (b. 1957)
Linda MacNeil (b. 1954)
Dante Marioni (b. 1964)
Richard Marquis (b. 1945)
Concetta Mason (b. 1952)
Josiah McElheny (b. 1966)
Nancy Mee (b. 1951)
Rick Mills (b. 1957)
Carol Milne (b. 1962)
Debora Moore (b. 1960)
William Morris (b. 1957)
Jay Musler (b. 1949)
Willemina Ogterop (1881–1974)
Andy Paiko (b. 1977)
Kit Paulson (b. 1981)
Simon Pearce (born 1946 in Ireland)
Flo Perkins (b. 1951)
Seth Parks (b. 1984)
David Patchen (b. 1966)
Susan Plum (b. 1944)
Kari Russell-Pool (b. 1967)
Christopher Ries (b. 1952)
Henry Richardson (b. 1961)
Richard Ritter (b. 1940)
Stephen Rolfe Powell (1951–2019)
Ginny Ruffner (b. 1952)
Italo Scanga (1932–2001)
Mary Shaffer (b. 1947)
Josh Simpson (b. 1949)
Paul Joseph Stankard (b. 1943)
Therman Statom (b. 1953)
Jack Storms (b. 1970)
Tim Tate (b. 1960)
Michael Taylor (b. 1943)
Cappy Thompson (b. 1952)
Louis Comfort Tiffany (1848–1933)
Erwin Timmers (b. 1964, in Amsterdam, Holland)
Kate Vogel (b. 1956)

Notes and references

 
Glass